The Third Avenue–149th Street station is a station on the IRT White Plains Road Line of the New York City Subway. It is located at Third Avenue and East 149th Street (the latter of which is also known as Eugenio Maria de Hostos Boulevard) in the Hub in the South Bronx adjacent to Mott Haven and Melrose. The station is served by the 2 train at all times and the 5 train at all times except nights. The station is the second-busiest in the Bronx and 59th overall, with around 6.768 million passengers using the station as of 2019.

History

The station opened on July 10, 1905, along with the 149th Street–Grand Concourse station and the connection with the IRT Lenox Avenue Line in Manhattan. Free transfers were provided between the subway and the existing 149th Street elevated station of the IRT Third Avenue Line, which opened in 1887. The convergence of the two rapid transit lines, the surface trolley lines along Third Avenue and 149th Street, and the ensuing commercial development led to the coining of the name "the Hub" for the intersection in the early 20th century.

The city government took over the IRT's operations on June 12, 1940. Following the closure of the Third Avenue elevated in 1973, free paper transfers were provided between the subway and the Bx55 limited-stop bus, which replaced the elevated. However, scalpers would often resell these transfers for 50 cents. Because of the unique transfer, the station was one of the first to test the MetroCard system in the early 1990s, and the paper transfers were finally scrapped in 1997 with the wider rollout of the MetroCard.

In 1981, the MTA listed the station among the 69 most deteriorated stations in the subway system.

Station layout

The station has two tracks and two side platforms, with no crossovers between the platforms. The station has been renovated, with ADA-accessible elevators installed on both sides of the station.

The station tiles have dark red and dark green/gray lower accents and dark red upper border. There are ceramic mosaics, installed in 1996 under the MTA's Arts for Transit program, entitled Una Raza, Un Mundo, Universo (One Race, One World, One Universe), by Jose Ortega. Four such mosaics are on each platform near the fare control. The token booths are built into the wall. Prior to the renovation, terra cotta "3" plaques were on the platform walls. One of these has been preserved at the New York Transit Museum.

Immediately east (railroad north) of the station, past Bergen Avenue, the tracks ascend to become an elevated structure for the trip to East 180th Street. This is the longest section of elevated track built under IRT Contract I. At the El level, one can still see the shortened supports for former track connections with the Third Avenue El.

Exits
The fare control is at platform level and there is a closed crossunder. Each fare control area has a bus transfer booth, which was used for the connection to the former Bx55 bus route that replaced the IRT Third Avenue Line in the Bronx. The extra booths and turnstiles, while still present, are no longer in use, having closed in July 1997 when system-wide free transfers were introduced with the MetroCard.

For each platform, three staircases lead up from fare control to the street; the north side of 149th Street for the Manhattan-bound platform, and the south side for the Bronx-bound platform. The elevators are located on the west side of the intersection.

Points of interest
The station is located in the Hub, the oldest major shopping locale in the Bronx.

Nearby points of interest include:
 Alfred E. Smith Career and Technical Education High School
 Bronx Opera House
 College of New Rochelle, John Cardinal O'Connor Campus.
 Patterson Houses
 South Bronx Educational Campus, formerly South Bronx High School.

See also 
 149th Street (IRT Third Avenue Line)

References

External links 

 

IRT White Plains Road Line stations
New York City Subway stations in the Bronx
Railway stations in the United States opened in 1905
Mott Haven, Bronx
Melrose, Bronx
Third Avenue